The Aylsham Bypass Tunnel is the only railway tunnel in Norfolk, England currently open to trains. It carries the narrow gauge Bure Valley Railway under the Aylsham Bypass. The former Norfolk & Suffolk Joint Railway's Cromer Tunnel at Cromer is disused.

The original East Norfolk Railway crossed Bure Valley Lane at this point, by means of a level crossing, but the combination of heavy traffic and small steam trains is not encouraged in modern transport policies.

See also
Tunnels in the United Kingdom

References

External links

Bure Valley Railway

Rail transport in Norfolk
Buildings and structures in Norfolk
Railway tunnels in England
Tunnels in Norfolk
Aylsham